Spoon 21 (formerly known as Spoon) is a Hungarian band formed in 2013.

The four-member band was initially composed of three classmates at Arany János Sashegyi Gymnasium in Budapest, where they played regularly at school events. Their first major milestone was their appearance in the fifth season of the Hungarian TV music competition X-Faktor, where they were mentored by Gabi Tóth and reached sixth place. They participated in A Dal 2015, the 2015 edition of the national selection for Hungary for the Eurovision Song Contest 2015 with the song Keep Marching On. They were discovered by Gábor Heinz during the summer of 2014, playing on the streets of Balatonfüred, playing Heinz's own song for A Dal, Learning to Let Go. They reached the top four in the superfinal, but Boggie was selected to be the representative for Hungary that year.

In 2016, in addition to working on their first album, they undertook a month-long tour of performing street music on the streets of European cities. They played in Berlin, Amsterdam, London, Paris, and Majorca. In September, they performed a concert at theatre shows in London.

It was announced on 8 December 2016 that Spoon, now known as Spoon 21, would return to A Dal for the 2017 edition with the song Deák, the title being a reference to Deák Ferenc tér. They reached the semi-finals and were eliminated.

Members 
 Péter Földesi
 Márton Grósz
 Miklós Adrián Nagy 
 Kristóf Teremy

Discography 
 Keep Marching On (2014)
 Deák (2016)

Further reading 
 Spoon 21's profile page on A Dal 2017

References

External links 
 

Hungarian boy bands
Hungarian musical groups
Musicians from Budapest
Musical groups established in 2014
2014 establishments in Hungary